Indrema Entertainment Systems was a consumer electronics company famous for the Indrema L600 Entertainment System, a game console intended for independent game developers.

Founded in 1999 by John Gildred, Indrema's goal was to create a video game console based on common PC hardware and the Linux operating system. The console would have been the only open source console on the market, as well as the only modern console to allow free software to be written for it.

The console was expected to be released by the holiday season of 2000. An early developer unit was featured running Quake in the Indrema booth at LinuxWorld earlier in 2000. Those subscribed to Indrema's mailing list received a "top ten" list in the style of David Letterman in anticipation of the launch announcement.

After being unable to raise enough capital to mass-produce the console, Indrema shut down on April 6, 2001. In his last Indrema chat session, Gildred revealed that the company needed more than $10,000,000 in capital in order to continue and gave the following advice to the next video game startup: "finish product before talking about it."

L600 

The L600 was to be a Linux-based game console/computer and was in the process of being developed by Indrema until they ceased operations in April 2001. Besides game play, it was also to be a CD player, DVD player, web browser, and TiVo-like video recorder. It also would have been an MP3 storage device.

Had the console been released, it would have cost US$299 and would have had 30 games available at launch. It would have had 64MB of system RAM and 96MB of total memory. Its storage medium would have been 10GB discs. It would have had HDTV support at resolutions up to 1080i. Indrema would have let regular end-users develop their games via their development kit. Most companies charge more than $10,000 USD for their kits. It would have had a GPU slide bay (it would allow the user to slide out the graphics processor when a better one was available), an x86-based microprocessor running at 600 MHz, and it would have been able to process 120-180 million polygons per second.

There was little hope for the L600, however, as its speculated release date of Summer 2001 or later was after the launch of Sega's Dreamcast and Sony's PlayStation 2, and very near or after the release of Microsoft's Xbox and Nintendo's GameCube.  The Dreamcast and GameCube had launched at considerably lower prices, and PlayStation 2 and Xbox at the same speculated US$299 despite having bigger budgets and less advanced hardware than the L600 was supposed to have, leading to doubts.  It was just one of many independently developed systems that would be unable to take consumer attention and spending from more established, previously mentioned companies already in the market.

See also 
 Infinium Phantom
 ApeXtreme

External links
 Indrema Informer - includes technical specifications and a list of links to Indrema-related news articles.
 Next Generation (magazine) Lifecycle 2 Vol 3 #4

References

Defunct video game companies of the United States
Electronics companies established in 2000
Companies disestablished in 2001
Vaporware game consoles
x86-based game consoles
Linux companies
Linux-based video game consoles